The Chain Gate is one of the gates to the Al-Aqsa Mosque compund on the Temple Mount in the Old City of Jerusalem. It was previously known as David's Gate.

Description and history 
Its rectangular doors are 4.5 m high. There is a small opening large enough for one person to pass through when the gate is closed.

It was considered the most beautiful of the Temple Mount gates. According to Nasir-i-Khusraw, in order to reach the gate one had to pass through the market in the eastern section of the city and the gate itself had two openings that led into a large hall.

Its twin gate

 is the northern half of the double gate that includes the Chain Gate.
It is always closed. 
Its names:
 : the Gate of the Divine Presence, the Gate of God's Presence, or the Gate of Tranquillity. (cf  & )
 Originally  was the name of another gate at the Southern Wall, possibly one of the Double Gate.
 : the Gate of Peace.

Environs 
The southwestern part of the Muslim Quarter is outside the gate. The neighborhood is named after the gate. Chain Gate Street leads toward a market and eventually the gate.
Once inside the compound, one can immediately see the Dome of Moses (south) and Fountain of Qasim Pasha (north, also named , after the gate). The southwestern colonnade is the closest of the Mawazin.

The Chain Gate Minaret is just north of it. And north of that, one finds the al-Ashrafiyya Madrasa. 
South of the gate, and part of the compound wall, one sees the at-Tankiziyya Madrasa.

See also 
 Dome of the Chain, also in the compound

References

Gates in Jerusalem's Old City Walls
Muslim Quarter (Jerusalem)